Swisshome is an unincorporated community in Lane County, in the U.S. state of Oregon. It is along the Siuslaw River northeast of Mapleton, on Oregon Route 36.

The community's name was conferred in honor of a local Swiss family. Swisshome post office was established in 1902. The Coos Bay Rail Link passes through Swisshome.

The Deadwood Creek Bridge and the Wildcat Creek Bridge near Swisshome are two covered bridges that are on the National Register of Historic Places.

References

External links
Unreferenced Swisshome information from a Tripod website (has pop-ups)
February 2007 photos of Wildcat Creek Bridge
Historic photo of Deadwood Creek Bridge from Oregon Department of Transportation

1902 establishments in Oregon
Populated places established in 1902
Unincorporated communities in Lane County, Oregon
Unincorporated communities in Oregon